The 1982–83 FIBA European Cup Winners' Cup was the seventeenth edition of FIBA's 2nd-tier level European-wide professional club basketball competition, contested between national domestic cup champions, running from 5 October 1982 to 9 March 1983. It was contested by 19 teams, four less than in the previous edition.

Scavolini Pesaro defeated ASVEL, in the final held in Palma de Mallorca, winning its first FIBA European Cup Winners' Cup.

Participants

First round

|}

Second round

|}

*Stroitel withdrew before the first leg, and MAFC received a forfeit (2-0) in both games.

Automatically qualified to the Quarter finals group stage
 ZZI Olimpija
 FC Barcelona

Quarterfinals

Semifinals

|}

Final
March 9, Palacio Municipal de Deportes, Palma de Mallorca

|}

References

External links
 1982–83 FIBA European Cup Winner's Cup @ linguasport.com
FIBA European Cup Winner's Cup 1982–83

FIBA
FIBA Saporta Cup